The Naked Ape: A Zoologist's Study of the Human Animal is a 1967 book by English zoologist and ethologist Desmond Morris that looks at humans as a species and compares them to other animals. The Human Zoo, a follow-up book by Morris that examined the behaviour of people in cities, was published in 1969.

Summary
The Naked Ape, which was serialised in the Daily Mirror newspaper and has been translated into 23 languages, depicts human behaviour as largely evolved to meet the challenges of prehistoric life as a hunter .  The book was so named because out of 193 species of monkeys and apes, only humans (Homo sapiens sapiens) are not covered in hair. Desmond Morris, the author, who had been the curator of mammals at London Zoo, said his book was intended to popularise and demystify science.

Morris said that Homo sapiens not only have the largest brains of all higher primates, but that sexual selection in human evolution has caused humans to have the highest ratio of penis size to body mass. Morris conjectured that human ear-lobes developed as an additional erogenous zone to facilitate the extended sexuality necessary in the evolution of human monogamous pair bonding. Morris further stated that the more rounded shape of human female breasts means they are mainly a sexual signalling device rather than simply for providing milk for infants.

Morris framed many features of human behaviour in the context of evolution at a time when cultural explanations were more orthodox.  For example, Morris wrote that the intense human pair bond evolved so that men who were out hunting could trust that their mates back home were not having sex with other men, and suggested the possibility that sparse body hair evolved because the "nakedness" helped intensify pair bonding by increasing tactile pleasure.

Film adaptations
A 1973 film directed by Donald Driver, very loosely based on the book, was made starring Johnny Crawford and Victoria Principal. In 2006, an independent film was made, based loosely on the book, written and directed by Daniel Mellitz, starring Josh Wise, Chelse Swain, Sean Shanks, Amanda MacDonald, Tony LaThanh, Corbin Bernsen. Beyond their scripts being loosely based on his book, Morris was not involved in either film.

Bibliography
 The Naked Ape: A Zoologist's Study of the Human Animal; Jonathan Cape Publishing, 1967
 Corgi Books paperback editions, 1967, 1968, 1969
 Dell Publishing edition, 1969
 The Illustrated Naked Ape: A Zoologist's Study of the Human Animal, Jonathan Cape Publishing, 1987 (reviewed by Janet Dunaif-Hattis in American Anthropologist, vol. 89, mo. 3, pp. 732–733, September 1987)
 Vintage Books; new (revised) edition, 2005; 

Critical response
 John Lewis, B. Towers, Naked Ape or Homo sapiens?: Reply to Desmond Morris. Teilhard Study Library, 1969;

Censorship
In February 1976, the book was removed from high school library shelves by the board of education of the Island Trees Union Free School District in New York. This case became the subject of a U.S. Supreme Court case in 1982.

Cultural impact 
The book is mentioned in the Italian entry for the 2017 Eurovision Song Contest "Occidentali's Karma" by Francesco Gabbani, in which most of the lyrics contain philosophical references. The lyricist had read The Naked Ape himself. Morris, "fascinated by the culture, beauty and richness" of the references to his theories, sent Gabbani a signed copy of the Italian translation of the book as a sign of gratitude and support for the latter.

See also
 Charles Darwin
 Evolutionary psychology
 Sociobiology
 The Territorial Imperative, 1966 book by Robert Ardrey
 The Moral Animal, 1994 book by Robert Wright

Notes and references
Notes

References

External links
 , and review

1967 non-fiction books
Books by Desmond Morris
Censored books
English non-fiction books
Human evolution books
Jonathan Cape books
Non-fiction books adapted into films
Science books